Frederik Bertelsen (born 24 April 1974) is a Danish former cyclist. He competed in the men's team pursuit at the 1996 Summer Olympics.

References

External links
 

1974 births
Living people
Danish male cyclists
Olympic cyclists of Denmark
Cyclists at the 1996 Summer Olympics
Cyclists from Copenhagen
Danish track cyclists